Theodor Waitz (17 March 182121 May 1864) was a German psychologist and anthropologist. His research in psychology brought him into touch with anthropology, and he will be best remembered by his monumental work in six volumes, Die Anthropologie der Naturvölker ("The anthropology of peoples that live close to nature").

Biography
Waitz was born at Gotha and educated at the universities of Leipzig and Jena. He made philosophy, philology and mathematics his chief studies, and in 1848 he was appointed associate professor of philosophy at the University of Marburg (full professor, 1862). He was a severe critic of the philosophy of Fichte, Schelling and Hegel, and considered psychology to be the basis of all philosophy. He died in Marburg.

Theorizing boredom
Theodor Waitz contributed significantly as an affective psychologist, particularly in the field of conceptualizing boredom.According to Waitz, boredom was about flow of thoughts. As one thought begets another, expectations on where this thought is moving towards are generated. Boredom arises when those expectations are not met. Boredom is basically associated with a break in the expected flow of thoughts because of a mismatch between expected and actual mental activity.

Works
The first four volumes of his Anthropologie der Naturvölker appeared at Leipzig, 1859–64, the last two were issued posthumously, edited by Georg Gerland. Waitz also published:
 Grundlegung der Psychologie (1846).
 Lehrbuch der Psychologie als Naturwissenschaft (1849).
 Allgemeine Pedagogik (1852).
 Die Indianer Nordamerikas (1864).
 Aristotelis Organon graece; a critical edition of the Organon of Aristotle (1844).

References

Burton, R.F. (1864), "Notes on Waitz's Anthropology", Anthropological Review, Vol. II, pp. 233–50.

Attribution:
 

1821 births
1864 deaths
German psychologists
German anthropologists
Academic staff of the University of Marburg
People from Gotha (town)